Arambakkam is a village in the Tiruvallur district of Tamil Nadu, India. It is located in the Gummidipoondi taluk.

Demographics 
According to the 2011 census of India, Arambakkam has 2798 households. The effective literacy rate (i.e. the literacy rate of population excluding children aged 6 and below) is 65.89%.

All the inhabitants could understand and speak Tamil and Telugu as it is in near to Andhra border.

Transportation 
There is a Railway station in Arambakkam railway station . Many Suburban train  , Passenger trains are run to Chennai Central railway station , Nellore railway station,  Tirupati railway station .

National Highway 16 (India)  passes through this city.

Most of APSRTC and TNSTC Buses are well connected to Chennai Tirupathi and Nellore through arambakkam Town.

References 

Villages in Gummidipoondi taluk